This is a list of Salvadoran writers, including novelists, short story writers, poets, and journalists. 
 
 Claribel Alegría (born 1924)
 Arturo Ambrogi (1874-1936)
 Manlio Argueta (born 1935)
 Salvador Salazar Arrué (Salarrué) (1899-1975)
 José Roberto Cea (born 1939)
 Roque Dalton (1935-1975)
 Francisco Andrés Escobar (born 1942)
 Jacinta Escudos  (born 1961)
 Alfredo Espino (1900-1928)
 Miguel Ángel Espino  (1903-1967)
 Francisco Gavidia  (1863-1955)
 Claudia Hernández  (born 1975)
 José María Peralta Lagos (1873-1944)
 Claudia Lars (1899-1974)
 Hugo Lindo (1917-1985)
 Alberto Masferrer (1868-1932)
 Nora Méndez  (born 1969)
 Horacio Castellanos Moya (born 1957)
 Rafael Menjívar Ochoa  (born 1959)
 Pedro Geoffroy Rivas (1908-1979)
 Juan Felipe Toruño (born 1898)
 Ítalo López Vallecillos (born 1932-1986)
 Roberto Armijo (born 1937-1997)
 Alfonso Quijada Urías  (born 1940)
 Lilliam Armijo (born 1984)
 Bruno Panzacchi (born 1987)
 Federico Navarrete (born 1990)

Salvadoran